Big Prairie, Montana, el. , is an open meadow area on the east side of the North Fork of the Flathead River, in Glacier National Park and is a former settlement.  It is within Flathead County, Montana.  It was settled by at least 19 homesteads in the early 20th century.

It is the location of several places listed on the National Register of Historic Places:
Margaret McCarthy Homestead
J. K. Miller Homestead
William Raftery Homestead
Anton Schoenberger Homestead
Charlie Schoenberger Homestead
Johnnie Walsh's Guest Lodge
Johnnie Walsh Homestead

External links

Notes

Geography of Flathead County, Montana
Glacier National Park (U.S.)